The Hydroaéroplane Savary was a French floatplane built in the early 1910s.

Specifications

References

Bibliography

Single-engined tractor aircraft
Aircraft first flown in 1912